Jeff Madsen (born June 7, 1985, in Santa Monica, California) is a four-time World Series of Poker bracelet winner and the 2006 World Series of Poker Player of the Year.

Early life and education
Madsen was raised in Pacific Palisades, Los Angeles, and graduated from Palisades Charter High School. He matriculated at the University of California, Santa Barbara to study film. Despite originally wanting to finish his degree, Madsen dropped out of college in his final year to fully focus on his poker career.

Poker career
Madsen was introduced to the game of poker after graduating high school. While a student at UCSB, he began playing casino poker at the Chumash Casino in Santa Ynez, California, where the minimum age to play is 18.

Madsen won a no limit Texas hold 'em event at the 2006 World Series of Poker just 3 years later. At the age of 21 years and five weeks, he was about six weeks younger than the previous record holder, Eric Froehlich, who won his first WSOP bracelet in 2005. Madsen's victory earned him $660,948. At that time he was the youngest World Series of Poker winner in history until Steve Billirakis became the youngest at the age of 21 years 11 days the following year.

Less than two weeks prior to his victory, Madsen finished third in the $2,000 Omaha high-low split event, winning $97,552. Just six days after his first victory, Madsen won his second WSOP title, and $643,381, in the $5,000 no limit hold 'em shorthanded event.  A few days later he finished third in the $1000 Seven-card stud high low split event, earning $65,971, adding up to an unprecedented four top 3 finishes, in four different poker variants, in his first year at the WSOP. His showing prompted Full Tilt Poker to bring him in as a sponsored pro.

In 2007, Madsen cashed in his first WPT event, finishing eighth at the Bay 101 Shooting Star Championship.

On February 5, 2010 Madsen won the $3,500 buy-in Championship Event at the Borgata Winter Open in Atlantic City, NJ winning $625,006.

As of 2022, Madsen's tournament winnings exceed $6,000,000. His 132 cashes at the WSOP account for $3,409,063 of those winnings.

Personal life
Madsen lives in Las Vegas.

WSOP Bracelets

Notes

External links
Sports Illustrated feature story
PokerListings.com profile

1985 births
American poker players
World Series of Poker bracelet winners
WSOP Player of the Year Award winners
Living people
People from Santa Monica, California
University of California, Santa Barbara alumni